Melrose is a modern cultivar of domesticated apple which was developed by Freeman S. Howlett at the Ohio Agricultural Experiment Station in Ohio, United States, and is regarded as the official apple of that state.

This apple was released by the Ohio Agricultural Experiment Station in Wooster, Ohio during World War II and was obtained from a cross between the Jonathan and the Red Delicious apples. The result is flattened large fruit, which is streaked and flushed with dark red over a background of yellowish-green skin, with spots of russet. The flesh is creamy white, of firm and coarse texture, and juicy. The flavor is mildly acidic, similar to Jonathan, but not as tart.

It comes into season at the beginning of October.

References

External links
Specialty Produce
Backyard Gardener

American apples